Chariton High School is located in Chariton, Iowa, part of the Chariton Community School District. 

There are students from six towns including Chariton, Russell, Williamson, Lucas enrolled in the school.

Athletics 
Athletic teams of Chariton High School are known as the Chargers.  School colors have changed over the years.  Currently the school colors are Red and White, though many uniforms are trimmed in silver.
The Chargers participate in the South Central Conference in the following sports.

Football
Cross Country
 Boys' 1969 Class A State Champions
Volleyball
Basketball
Wrestling
Golf
Tennis
Track and Field
Soccer
Baseball
Softball

Notable alumni
Paul Engebretsen, National Football League player
T. J. Hockenson, Tight End, for the Minnesota Vikings of National Football League

See also
List of high schools in Iowa

References

External links
 Chariton High School

Chariton, Iowa
Public high schools in Iowa
Schools in Lucas County, Iowa